Pinson Valley High School (PVHS) is a four-year public high school in the Birmingham, Alabama suburb of Pinson. It is the fifth largest of the Jefferson County Board of Education's fourteen high schools. School colors are garnet and gold, and the athletic teams are called the Indians.  PVHS competes in AHSAA Class 6A athletics.

Student profile 
Enrollment in grades 9-12 for the 2013-14 school year is 1,028 students. Approximately 51% of students are white, 37% are African-American, 10% are Hispanic, and 2% are Asian-American. Roughly 42% of students qualify for free or reduced price lunch.

PVHS has a graduation rate of 83%. Approximately 75% of its students meet or exceed state proficiency standards in mathematics, and 78% meet or exceed standards in reading. The average ACT score for PVHS students is 22.

Campus
In 2008, a new Fine Arts and Science Center was added to the school. The auditorium seats 670 in a state-of-the-art facility. The Fine Arts Center houses the Pinson Valley Marching Chiefs, the school's award-winning marching band, is directed by Keith Brandenburg. The PVHS Choir program is led by Sarah Timothy. The theatre program is directed by John Bailey.

The campus also consists of the Willie Adams Stadium, two gymnasiums (including the Mike Dutton Gymnasium), academic classrooms, a fine arts center, and a lunchroom.

Athletics
PVHS competes in AHSAA Class 6A athletics and fields teams in the following sports:
 Baseball
 Basketball
 Bowling
 Cheerleading
 Cross Country
 Football
 Golf
 Indoor Track & Field
 Outdoor Track & Field
 Soccer
 Softball
 Tennis
 Volleyball
 Wrestling
The wrestling team won state championships in 1980, 1981, 1982, 1984, and 1990. The football team won area championships in 1998, 1999, 2017 and 2018.
The football team has won three state championships in 2017, 2018, and 2020 in Class 6A. PVHS Head football coach is Gentrell Eatman,  boys basketball head coach is Darrell Barber.  The basketball team won area championships in 2002, 2013, 2014, 2015, 2017, and 2018.  They also won the Class 6A State Championship in 2018. The boys soccer team has been to the final 4 twice, and are currently coached by Matt Manzella.

Notable alumni
 Marcus Brimage, professional Mixed Martial Artist formerly with the UFC
 Coty Clarke (born 1992), basketball player in the Israeli Basketball Premier League
 Zach Cunningham, former Vanderbilt University football player, Tennessee Titans linebacker in the NFL
 Terry Hoeppner, former head football coach at Pinson Valley, later head coach at Miami University and Indiana University
 Desmond Jennings, former MLB player, Tampa Bay Rays 
 Terry Jones, former MLB player, Colorado Rockies and Montreal Expos
 Bo Nix, quarterback for the Auburn Tigers and Oregon Ducks
 Shay Shelnutt, Alabama State Senator, District 17
 Melinda Toole Gunter, former Miss Alabama
 Kool-Aid McKinstry, Alabama Crimson Tide cornerback

References

External links
 Pinson Valley High School Website

Public high schools in Alabama
Educational institutions established in 1972
Schools in Jefferson County, Alabama
1972 establishments in Alabama